The 2019–20 Scottish League Cup (also known as the Betfred Cup for sponsorship reasons) was the 74th season of Scotland's second-most prestigious football knockout competition.

The format for the 2019–20 competition was the same as the previous three seasons.

It began with eight groups of five teams which included all 2018–19 Scottish Professional Football League (SPFL) clubs, excluding those competing in Champions League and Europa League qualifiers, as well as the winners of the 2018–19 Highland Football League (Cove Rangers) and the 2018–19 Lowland Football League (East Kilbride).

Schedule

Format
The competition began with eight groups of five teams. The four clubs competing in the UEFA Champions League (Celtic) and Europa League (Rangers, Kilmarnock, and Aberdeen) qualifying rounds were given a bye through to the second round. The 40 teams competing in the group stage consisted of the other eight teams that competed in the 2018–19 Scottish Premiership, and all of the teams that competed in the 2018–19 Scottish Championship, 2018–19 Scottish League One and 2018–19 Scottish League Two, as well as the 2018–19 Highland Football League and the 2018–19 Lowland Football League champions.

The winners of each of the eight groups, as well as the four best runners-up progressed to the second round (last 16), which includes the four UEFA qualifying clubs. At this stage, the competition reverts to the traditional knock-out format. The four group winners with the highest points total and the clubs entering at this stage are seeded, with the four group winners with the lowest points unseeded along with the four best runners-up.

Bonus point system
In December 2015, the SPFL announced that alongside the new group stage format, a bonus point system would be introduced to provide greater excitement and increase the number of meaningful games at this stage. The traditional point system of awarding three points for a win and one point for a draw is used, however, for each group stage match that finishes in a draw, a penalty shoot-out takes place, with the winner being awarded a bonus point.

Group stage

The group stage was made up of eight teams from the 2018–19 Scottish Premiership, and all ten teams from each of the 2018–19 Scottish Championship, 2018–19 Scottish League One and 2018–19 Scottish League Two, as well as the winners of the 2018–19 Highland Football League and 2018–19 Lowland Football League. The 40 teams were divided into two sections – North and South – with each section containing four top seeds, four second seeds and 12 unseeded teams. Each section was drawn into four groups with each group comprising one top seed, one second seed and three unseeded teams.

The draw for the group stage took place on 28 May 2019 and was broadcast live on the SPFL YouTube channel.

North

Group A

Group B

Group C

Group D

South

Group E

Group F

Group G

Group H

Best runners-up

Knockout phase

Second round

Draw and seeding
The draw for the second round took place on 28 July 2019 at the conclusion of the Dundee-Inverness Caledonian Thistle match. Aberdeen, Celtic, Kilmarnock and Rangers entered the competition at this stage, after receiving a bye for the group stage due to their participation in UEFA club competitions.

The four UEFA-qualifying clubs and the four group winners with the best record were seeded for the draw.

Teams in Bold advanced to the quarter-finals.

Notes
† denotes teams playing in the Championship.
* denotes teams playing in League One.

Matches

Quarter-finals

Draw
Teams in Bold advanced to the semi-finals.

Matches

Semi-finals

Draw
Teams in Bold advanced to the final.

Teams in Italics were not known at the time of the draw.

Matches

Final

Media coverage
The domestic broadcasting rights for the competition are held exclusively by BT Sport.

The following matches were broadcast live on UK television:

References

External links
 

Scottish League Cup seasons
League Cup
League Cup